Triptych (stylized as TRIPtych) is The Tea Party's fifth album, released in 1999. It has the trio blending the major influences found on their previous albums: the earthy rock of Splendor Solis, the world music inspired arrangements of The Edges of Twilight, and the industrial edge of Transmission.

After the gloom of Transmission, which relied heavily on sampling and electronica, for Triptych the band wrote with both melody and content, while using electronica subtlety. This is evidenced by the Juno Award nominated single "Heaven Coming Down", the band's first number one single in Canada. The album itself reached #4 on the Canadian album chart, and received a Juno nomination for "Best Rock Album", before achieving double platinum sales in Canada.

In June 2000, the EMI labels in Europe released Triptych Special Tour Edition 2000, which included a bonus disc of eight unreleased songs.

Reception 
In 2005, Triptych was ranked number 435 in Rock Hard magazine's book The 500 Greatest Rock & Metal Albums of All Time.

Track listing 

The unlisted 13th track is the sound of a clock chiming.

Special Tour Edition 2000 Bonus Disc 
 "Psychopomp" (live) – 5:10
 "The River" (live) – 5:11
 "Save Me" (live) – 8:23
 "Lifeline" – 4:37
 "A Woman Like You" (Bert Jansch) – 3:46
 "Temptation" (Rhys Fulber remix) – 5:50
 "Sister Awake" (live) – 5:35
 "Waiting for a Sign" – 4:19

Singles 
 "Heaven Coming Down"
 "The Messenger"
 "Touch"
 "These Living Arms"
 "Gone"

Personnel 
Jeff Martin – production and recording
Don Hachey – engineering
Jeff Martin and Nick Blagona – mixing at Metalworks Studios, (Mississauga)
Nick Blagona – mastering at Metalworks Mastering
Stuart Chatwood – cover art conception
Antonie Moonen – design
James St Laurent – cover photography
David Giammarco – special thanks

String quartet 
 "Gone"
 Ligia Paquin – viola
 François Pilon – violin
 Benoit Loiselle – cello
 Stéphanie Meyer – cello

Charts

References 

1999 albums
2000 albums
The Tea Party albums
Albums recorded at Le Studio
Albums recorded at Metalworks Studios